Eliza Vozemberg (born 14 September 1956) is a Greek lawyer and politician who has been serving as a Member of the European Parliament (MEP) for New Democracy since 2014.

Early life
Eliza Vozemberg was born in Athens in 1956. On her father's side, she is a descendant of Otto's Bavarians. Eliza studied law and political sciences at the National and Kapodistrian University of Athens. When she was 16 years old, she took part in the famous comedy film 'H Rena Einai Offside' along with Rena Vlahopoulou.

Member of the European Parliament
Since becoming a Member of the European Parliament in the 2014 elections, Vozemberg has been serving on the Committee on Women's Rights and Gender Equality. She was also a member of the Committee on Transport and Tourism from 2014 until 2019.

In addition to her committee assignments, Vozemberg is a member of the Parliament's delegation to the EU-Turkey Joint Parliamentary Committee. She is also a member of the European Parliament Intergroup on Seas, Rivers, Islands and Coastal Areas and the MEPs Against Cancer group.

References

External links
Official website 
at athenstimeout.gr

1956 births
Living people
National and Kapodistrian University of Athens alumni
Greek MPs 2009–2012
Greek women lawyers
New Democracy (Greece) MEPs
MEPs for Greece 2014–2019
MEPs for Greece 2019–2024
Politicians from Athens
21st-century women MEPs for Greece
20th-century Greek lawyers
21st-century Greek lawyers
20th-century women lawyers
21st-century women lawyers